General elections were held in Sweden on 19 September 1982. They saw the return of the Swedish Social Democratic Party to power after six years in opposition, the longest period in opposition by the Social Democrats since the 1910s. The center-right coalition of Thorbjörn Fälldin had earlier suffered a loss upon the breakup of the government in 1981, the year before the election, when the rightist Moderate Party chose to withdraw from the government, protesting against the centrist tax policies of the Fälldin government. After regaining power, Social Democratic leader Olof Palme succeeded in being elected Prime Minister again, having earlier held power between 1969 and 1976.

The 2,533,250 votes for the Social Democrats is, in spite of a larger electorate, as of 2022 the highest number of people voting for a single party in Swedish electoral history, although the party had previously recorded higher percentage shares.

Results

Seat distribution

By municipality

References

General elections in Sweden
General
Sweden
Sweden